Social Security Forces is a North Korean paramilitary force which performs various internal security and border security tasks. It has 11,000 to 140,000 troops.

Organization
In peacetime, it is under the command of the Ministry of Social Security, the principal law-enforcement agency, but in case of emergency, it is more heavily armed than the border guards of other countries because it is incorporated into the regular army. The commander of the Social Security Forces is concurrently the First deputy minister of Social Security, at some point of time Ri Thae-chol

History
The roots of the Social Security Forces began in 1947 with the creation of the 5th Department of the Ministry of Internal Affairs which succeeded the 38th Guard Corps. With the separation of the Ministry of Social Security in October 1962, the People's Guard was created and placed under it. In the 1980s, the work of the Korean People's Guard was transferred to the Ministry of National Security, and it is understood that in October 1996, the border guard service was transferred to the Ministry of People's Armed Forces, the predecessor of the Ministry of National Defence. In 2010 the People's Guards Forces (Korean: 조선인민경비대) was changed to Korean People's Internal Security Forces (Korean: 조선인민내무군) and was subordinated to the Ministry of People's Security. On the June 28th, 2020, the Rodong Sinmun published the name 'Social Security Forces' in an article titled 'The Immediate Goal of Socialist Construction', saying, "The Social Security Force must successfully carry out the noble missions and duties of the Suyeong security, institutional security, and people's security."

Tasks
The Korean People's Guard is known to be in charge of guarding the Military Demarcation Line, borders, and coasts, as well as major strategic facilities such as government offices, the Central Committee Yongbyon nuclear facilities, power plants and broadcasting facilities.

See also
Law enforcement in North Korea
Korean People's Army
Reserve Military Training Units
Red Youth Guards
Socialist Patriotic Youth League
Worker-Peasant Red Guards

References

Law enforcement in North Korea
Government agencies of North Korea
Military of North Korea